Abū ʿAbd al-Raḥmān ʿAbd Allāh ibn ʿĀmir ibn Kurayz (626–678) was a Rashidun politician and general, serving as governor of Basra from 647 to 656 AD during the reign of Rashidun Caliph Uthman ibn Affan. He was a cousin of the Caliph through his father. He is known for his administrative and military prowess including his successful campaigns of reconquest and pacification of former territories of the Sasanian Empire in what is now Iran and Afghanistan.

Early life

Abd Allah ibn Amir was the son of Amir ibn Kurayz ibn Rabi'ah, the brother of Arwa bint Kurayz, who was the mother of Caliph Uthman ibn Affan.

Conquests during Caliph Umar's rule 

Ibn Amir's expeditions were particularly aimed at quelling revolts in former Persian territories.

Conquest of Sakastan

Having secured his position in Kerman, Abd Allah sent an army under Mujashi ibn Mas'ud there. After crossing the Dasht-i Lut desert, Mujashi ibn Mas'ud reached Sakastan, but suffered a heavy defeat and was forced to retreat. 

One year later, Abd-Allah ibn Amir sent an army under Rabi ibn Ziyad Harithi to Sakastan. After some time, Rabi reached Zaliq, a Sakastani border town, where he forced the dehqan of the town to acknowledge Rashidun authority.  He then did the same at the fortress of Karkuya, which had a famous fire temple mentioned in the Tarikh-i Sistan. He then seized more land in the province. Next, he besieged the provincial capital, Zrang, and, after a heavy battle outside the city, its governor, Aparviz, surrendered. When Aparviz went to Rabi ibn Ziyad to negotiate a treaty, he saw that Rabi was using the bodies of two dead soldiers as a chair. This horrified Aparviz, who, in order to spare the inhabitants of Sakastan from the Arabs, made peace with them in return for a heavy tribute of 1 million dirhams, including 1,000 slave boys (or girls) bearing 1,000 golden vessels. Rabi ibn Ziyad was then appointed governor of the province.

Conquest of Estakhr and Fars 
The city of Estakhr was destroyed after a battle to take the city and a force of 40,000 defenders including many Sasanian nobles were killed. Abd Allah invaded the Fars province and put an end to the Persian resistance.  After the Arab conquest of Pars, the Sasanian king Yazdegerd III fled to Kerman.

Conquest of Khorasan 
Later, Abd Allah sent Ahnaf ibn Qais and Amr ibn Ma'adi Yakrib towards a further expansion of Arab control of the Sasanian Empire which led to the Muslim conquest of Khorasan, during which they subdued the cities of Marw al-Rudh and Balkh. As winter came, Ahnaf and Amr stayed in Balkh.

Conquests during Caliph Uthman 
After the death of Caliph Umar and the ascension of Uthman ibn al-Affan as Caliph, some of the just annexed Persian territory rebelled. In the wake of the rebellions Uthman commanded Abd Allah to subjugate the rebellious territories and continue the conquest of the remnants of the Sasanian empire.

Caliph Uthman sanctioned an attack against Makran in 652 AD, and sent a reconnaissance mission to Sindh in 653 AD. The mission described Makran as inhospitable, and Caliph Uthman, probably assuming the country beyond was much worse, forbade any further incursions into India.

Conquest of Kerman

The Rashidun caliphate sent two contingents tasked with conquering the Sasanian province of Kerman, headed by Ibn Amir and Suhail, who reached Tabasayn. Then, they advanced towards Nishapur. Ibr Amir and Suhail quickly met opposition, with fighting against the Koch and Baloch, resulting in the death of the governor of Kerman.

Appointment as the Governor of Basra
In 647 AD, Abu Musa al-Ash'ari was deposed from the governorship of Basra. Uthman appointed Ibn Amir as the new Governor of Basra. Ibn Amir was twenty-five years old at that time.

During his tenure as governor in Basra, Ibn Amir changed the town from a merely transient camp to a permanent settlement, and the town gradually become a centre of commerce in Iraq. While Ibn Amir was involved in further conquests to the east, Basra gradually also started to lose her characteristic as a frontier garrison.

Uthman was aiming to solve tensions in the newly-conquered Iraq caused by the sudden influx of Arab tribesmen into garrison towns such as Kufa and Basra. He did so by opening new fronts in territories he aimed to conquer. This aimed to consume and channel the tribesmen's energy towards new military expeditions. When Ibn Amir arrived at Basra, he immediately prepared for new conquests into Persia. Ibn Amir reformed Basra in many ways, including the construction of a new irrigation canal and fixing the water supply infrastructure for the use of Hajj pilgrims passing through the area.

Re-conquest of Fars
During Uthman’s reign, the province revolted alongside other Sasanian provinces. Uthman directed Ibn Amir to crush the rebellion.

Accordingly, Ibn Amir marched his forces into Persepolis, which surrendered and agreed to pay tribute. From there, the army marched to the city of Al j bard, where he encountered little resistance. Its citizens agreed to pay tribute. 

Ibn Amir then advanced to Gor. The Sasanians fought against his forces, but they were defeated and the city was captured. Peace was made which included the introduction of Jizya. While the army was still in Gor, Persepolis again revolted. Ibn Amir brought his forces to back to Persepolis and laid siege on the city. After a violent battle, Ibn Amir's army was able to regain control of the city.  All the Sasanian leaders guilty of instigating the revolt were captured and executed. With the fall of Persepolis, other cities in Fars also surrendered unconditionally. The Uthman-appointed governor of Pars, after analysing the situation, sent Islamic missionaries to various cities in the region to convert the people to Islam, with the hopes of avoiding future revolts.

Reconquest of Kerman
After suppressing revolts in Fars, ibn Amir turned towards Kerman, which revolted again in 651-652 AD. He sent a force under the command of Mujasshaa ibn Musa Salmi. Kerman was soon re-conquered with little resistance.

Re-conquest of Sistan

Uthman then directed Ibn Amir, who at the time was Governor of Basra, to re-conquer the province. Troops were sent to Sistan under Rabi' ibn Ziyad's command. He re-conquered the area up to what is now Zaranj in Afghanistan. Ibn Ziyad was made governor of Sistan, where he remained for some time.  He then returned to Basra, whereupon the province revolted once again, this time affecting a much larger area.

Ibn Amir sent Abd al-Rahman ibn Samura to reconquer Sistan. Ibn Samura led the Muslim forces to Zaranj. Once Zaranj was captured, Ibn Samura marched into Afghanistan and conquered it as far as Kabul. After this campaign Ibn Amir set his eyes toward Khorasan.

Re-conquest of Khorasan

Khorasan, a province of the Sasanian Empire, was conquered during the reign of Caliph Umar, by troops under the command of Ahnaf ibn Qais. After Caliph Umar's death, Khorasan was the subject of a series of revolts under Sasanian King Yazdegerd III. But before he could lead the Sasanians against the Muslims, he was betrayed and killed in 651. The same year Caliph Uthman ordered ibn Amir to re-conquer Khorasan. Ibn Amir marched with a large force from Basra to Khorasan to be joined by another contingent led by Said Ibn Al-Aas, who departed from Kufa together with Hudzaifah Ibn Al-Yaman, Husayn ibn Ali and Hasan ibn Ali. 

After capturing the main forts in Khorasan, ibn Amir sent many columns invarious directions into Khorasan in order to prevent the Sasanians from gathering into a large force. The town of Bayak, in modern Afghanistan, was taken by force, with a Muslim commander falling in the battle. After Bayak, the Muslims marched towards Tabisan, which was captured with little resistance. The Muslim army captured the city of Nishapur after a long siege. The Muslim army continued capturing other towns in the Khorasan region and consolidated their position in the region. The Muslim army then marched towards Herat in Afghanistan, which surrendered to the Muslims peacefully. After gaining control of the region the Muslims marched towards the city of Merv in modern Turkmenistan. The city surrendered along with other towns in the region except for one, Sang, which was later taken by force. The campaign in Khorasan ended with the conquest of Balkh (Afghanistan) in 654.

However, a second uprising broke out again in Khorasan in the wake of the first Muslim civil war when Muawiya was appointed as Caliph replacing Ali. This revolt was centred in Herat and Balkh. Abd Allah ibn Amir was appointed once again to deal with the revolt. This time the retaliation was fierce and swift and the famous Zoroastrian temple of Nobahar was destroyed.

Campaign in Transoxiana
After consolidating Muslim forces in Khorasan, Abd Allah ibn Amir crossed the Oxus River which was known to the Muslims as the Amu Darya and invaded Uzbekistan in southern Transoxiana. Details of these campaigns are little known but a greater part of southern Transoxiana submitted to the suzerainty of the Rashidun Caliphate.

Death of Caliph Uthman and its aftermath

After the successful completion of his campaigns, Abd Allah ibn Amir donned the Ahram in Nishapur, and made a pilgrimage to Mecca to perform the Hajj and offer thanks to God. After performing the Hajj, Abd Allah ibn Amir proceeded to Medina to see Uthman. But before Abd Allah ibn Amir reached Medina, Uthman had been killed. 
Abda
When Zubayr ibn al-Awwam, Talha and Ayesha raised the call for vengeance over the death of Uthman by the rebels, Abd Allah ibn Amir suggested they come with him to Basra because of his greater influence in the city. The confederates succeeded in capturing Basra because of the influence that Abd Allah ibn Amir commanded over the people of Basra. Along with Talha and Zubayr ibn al-Awwam, Abd Allah ibn Amir arrested and killed around 4000 suspected rebels in connection with the murder of Caliph Uthman. In the Battle of the Camel in December 656, the confederates were defeated and Basra was captured by Caliph Ali.

During Caliph Ali’s reign
The reign of Caliph Ali was full of turbulence. Though Abd Allah ibn Amir did not take part in the Battle of Siffin, fought between the forces of Caliph Ali and Muawiyah, he supported the those seeking revenge for Caliph Uthman's murder.  After the murder of Caliph Ali in 661, his eldest son Hassan ibn Ali became the caliph. However, he was pressured by the Syrian governor Muawiyah to resign as Caliph. To avoid another civil war, Hassan ibn Ali resigned in the favour of Muawiyah six months later. During this time Abd Allah ibn Amir supported the caliphate of Muawiyah.

During Muawiyah’s reign
The caliphate of Muawiyah founded the Umayyad dynasty, dissolving the Rashidun empire. Abd Allah ibn Amir remained the governor of Basra under the Umayyad dynasty for some time, though later Muawiyah disposed him from the governorship of Basra.

During his brief rule in Basra under Muawiyah, he had struck Sasanian style coinage which was imprinted with the portrait of the Sassanid Khusraw Parviz, as mentioned in the Muwatta Imam Malik by Malik ibn Anas.

In the wake of civil wars of the early 660s, crime was increasing in Basra. His successor al-Harith ibn Abd Allah al-Azdi failed to maintain public order. When Ziyad ibn Abihi arrived in 665 as governor, he recruited private watchmen who were hired by wealthy people fearing the level of crime in the city. Ziyad then established the "al-Shurta" which consisted of four thousand infantry and cavalry, imposed curfews and put in place draconian laws such as beheading anyone on the streets after the time of evening prayers. He also re-established order on the roads outside Basra by appointing chiefs of Tamim and Bakr clan as the security forces of those roads.

Death
Abd Allah ibn Amir was a well regarded governor of the province of Basra for 9 years (647 – 656).  Ibn Amir protested against his dismissal. Nevertheless, Abd Allah ibn Amir left Basra after his dismissal for Medina and died there in 678.

See also
Rashidun Caliphs
Rashidun Empire
Rashidun army
Khalid ibn Walid
Muslim conquest of Persia
Military campaigns under Caliph Uthman

References

Bibliography 
 
  

 

678 deaths
Arab generals
626 births
Generals of the medieval Islamic world
People of the Muslim conquest of Persia
7th-century Arabs
Umayyad governors of Basra
Rashidun governors of Basra
Banu Abd Shams